The 2020–21 Minnesota State Mavericks men's ice hockey season was the 52nd season of play for the program, the 25th at the Division I level and the 22nd in the WCHA conference. The Mavericks represented Minnesota State University, Mankato and were coached by Mike Hastings, in his 9th season.

Season
As a result of the ongoing COVID-19 pandemic the entire college ice hockey season was delayed. Because the NCAA had previously announced that all winter sports athletes would retain whatever eligibility they possessed through at least the following year, none of Minnesota State's players would lose a season of play. However, the NCAA also approved a change in its transfer regulations that would allow players to transfer and play immediately rather than having to sit out a season, as the rules previously required.

After missing out on a chance at postseason glory last year, Minnesota State didn't miss a beat and came into this year a house afire. The Mavericks won 9 of their first 11 games with Dryden McKay earning 6 shutouts. The second half of the regular season was nearly as outstanding as the first; MSU went 9–2 down the stretch and finished miles ahead of the second place team in the WCHA. With their record, the Mavericks were guaranteed a spot in the NCAA Tournament but could improve their ranking with a good performance in the conference tournament.

As the top seed, MSU played woeful Ferris State in the quarterfinals. The Mavericks' offense was quiet for much of the series but the defense was stout. Minnesota State surrendered one goal in two games and swept the Bulldogs. They faced an upstart Northern Michigan team in the semifinals and laid a complete egg. Northern Michigan scored the first five goals of the game, chasing McKay from the cage, and then played a defensive shell over the final 20 minutes to upset the Mavericks.

Losing in the semifinal cost MSU the chance to earn a #1 seed and they dropped all the way to 6th in the rankings. The team had to face Quinnipiac in the opening game and got off to a bad start. The Bobcats scored twice in the first while MSU could only muster 6 shots. The Mavericks woke up in the second and cut the lead in half near the end of the period. The third saw the team having to kill off a lengthy 2-man advantage only to surrender a goal a couple of minutes later. MSU bore down and scored with more than 5 minutes to play but, as time ticked away, the team was forced to pull McKay for an extra attacker and Cade Borchardt tied the game with 62 seconds remaining. The game went into overtime and, just like they had been in the third, Minnesota State was the aggressor. The Mavericks continued to put pressure on the Quinnipiac net until Ryan Sandelin banged in a loose puck and won the game for the Mavericks.

The win was the first tournament victory for Minnesota State at the Division I level, snapping a 6-game losing streak. The last NCAA Tournament win for the program had come 30 years earlier when the school was still called 'Mankato State University'

After the win, the team appeared to relax and played their next opponent, Minnesota, like the juggernaut they had been during the regular season. MSU held the Gophers, which had the #2 offense in the nation, to just 9 shots in the first two periods. The Mavericks scored twice in the opening frame and twice more in the third. McKay held the fort during Minnesota's attempted comeback in the final period but he surrendered nothing. The shutout was the 10th of the season for McKay, placing him just 2 behind Ryan Miller for the most in a career.

Minnesota State advanced to its first Frozen Four as the highest remaining seed and faced former WCHA rival St. Cloud State in the semifinal. McKay wasn't sharp in the game, allowing 3 goals in the first 23 minutes, but MSU fought back and took a 4–3 lead early in the third. The Huskies tied the game for the fourth time mid-way through the period but neither team seemed able to finish the scoring in regulation. With less than a minute to play St. Cloud deflected a puck into the net and MSU was unable to earn a tying goal, ending their season.

Tanner Edwards and Evan Foss sat out the season.

Departures

Recruiting

Roster
As of December 17, 2020.

,

Standings

Schedule and Results

|-
!colspan=12 style=";" | Regular season

|-
!colspan=12 style=";" | 

|- align="center" bgcolor="#e0e0e0"
|colspan=12|Minnesota State Won Series 2–0

|-
!colspan=12 style=";" |

Scoring statistics

Goaltending statistics

Rankings

USCHO did not release a poll in week 20.

Awards and honors

References

Minnesota State Mavericks men's ice hockey seasons
Minnesota State
Minnesota State
Minnesota State
Minnesota State
Minnesota State
Minnesota State